The following are lists of animal diseases:

 List of aquarium diseases
 List of dog diseases
 List of feline diseases
 List of diseases of the honey bee
 List of diseases spread by invertebrates 
 Poultry disease
 Zoonosis#Lists of diseases, infectious diseases that have jumped from an animal to a human

See also
 :Category:Animal diseases
 Veterinary medicine
 Foot-and-mouth disease

References